Lucy Griffiths is the name of:
Lucy Griffiths (actress, born 1919) (1919–1982), English actress
Lucy Griffiths (actress, born 1986), English actress